Tiffany Woosley is a former professional basketball player. In her senior year at University of Tennessee she injured her right knee, sidelining her for the rest of the season. She coached at Lincoln County High School in Fayetteville, Tennessee in the 1996–97 school year before beginning her WNBA career. She currently lives in Shelbyville though previously lived in Tullahoma.

Awards and honors

College
Two-time All-South Eastern Conference mention
4x SEC champion

WNBA
2x WNBA Champion (1997–98)

Career statistics

Regular season

|-
| style="text-align:left;background:#afe6ba;"|1997†
| style="text-align:left;"|Houston
| 26 || 4 || 15.3 || .330 || .320 || .250 || 1.1 || 1.1 || 0.7 || 0.0 || 1.2 || 2.9
|-
| style="text-align:left;background:#afe6ba;"|1998†
| style="text-align:left;"|Houston
| 18 || 0 || 5.3 || .304 || .250 || .714 || 0.4 || 0.5 || 0.4 || 0.0 || 0.7 || 1.2
|-
| style="text-align:left;"|Career
| style="text-align:left;"|2 years, 1 team
| 44 || 4 || 11.2 || .324 || .306 || .467 || 0.8 || 0.9 || 0.6 || 0.0 || 1.0 || 2.2

Playoffs

|-
| style="text-align:left;background:#afe6ba;"|1997†
| style="text-align:left;"|Houston
| 1 || 0 || 3.0 || — || — || — || 0.0 || 0.0 || 0.0 || 0.0 || 1.0 || 0.0

References

External links
Tiffany Woosley - basketball-reference.com

1973 births
Living people
American women's basketball coaches
American women's basketball players
Basketball coaches from Tennessee
Basketball players from Tennessee
Guards (basketball)
High school basketball coaches in the United States
Houston Comets players
People from Shelbyville, Tennessee
People from Tullahoma, Tennessee
Tennessee Lady Volunteers basketball players
Undrafted Women's National Basketball Association players